Coop is a system of Italian consumers' cooperatives which operates one of the largest supermarket chains in Italy. Its headquarters are located in Casalecchio di Reno, Province of Bologna.

The first cooperative shop was established in Turin in 1854.
As of 2010, Coop's system operates with 115 consumers' cooperatives of various sizes (9 large, 14 medium, and 92 small), with  1,444 shops, 56,682 employers, more than 7,429,847 members, and an annual revenue of €12.9 billion.

Big Cooperatives
North-West District
Coop Liguria (provinces of Genoa, Savona, La Spezia, Imperia, Alessandria, Cuneo);
Coop Lombardia (provinces of Varese, Como, Milan, Monza and Brianza, Lodi, Pavia, Cremona, Brescia, Bergamo);
Novacoop (provinces of Turin, Biella, Vercelli, Novara, Verbania, Varese, Milan, Cuneo, Asti, Alessandria).
Adriatic District
Coop Alleanza 3.0 (formed by the merger of the three big cooperatives of the Adriatic District, Coop Adriatica, Coop Consumatori Nordest and Coop Estense on 1 January 2016) (provinces of Trieste, Gorizia, Udine, Pordenone, Belluno, Vicenza, Treviso, Padua, Venezia, Treviso, Rovigo, Brescia, Mantua, Piacenza, Parma, Reggio Emilia, Modena, Bologna, Ferrara, Ravenna, Forlì-Cesena, Rimini, Pesaro e Urbino, Ancona, Macerata, Fermo, Ascoli Piceno,  Chieti, Foggia, Barletta-Andria-Trani, Bari, Brindisi, Taranto, Lecce, Matera).
Tyrrenic District
Coop Centro Italia (provinces of Arezzo, Siena, Perugia, Terni, Rieti, L'Aquila);
Unicoop Firenze (provinces of Lucca, Pisa, Pistoia, Prato, Florence, Arezzo, Siena);
Unicoop Tirreno (provinces of Massa-Carrara, Lucca, Livorno, Grosseto, Siena, Terni, Viterbo, Rome, Latina, Frosinone, Naples, Avellino).

See also

 CoopVoce
 Consumers' cooperative

References

External links

 Official website 

Cooperatives in Italy
Retail companies of Italy
Supermarkets of San Marino